Omicron Scorpii (ο Sco, ο Scorpii) is a star in the zodiac constellation of Scorpius. With an apparent visual magnitude of +4.57, it is visible to the naked eye. Parallax measurements indicate a distance of roughly 900 light years. It is located in the proximity of the Rho Ophiuchi dark cloud.

This is a white A-type bright giant with a stellar classification of A4II/III. It is one of the brighter members of this rare class of stars, making it of interest for study. Omicron Scorpii has about eight times the mass of the Sun, fifteen times the radius, and is roughly 40 million years old. The star is radiating around 3,200 times the luminosity of the Sun from its outer atmosphere at an effective temperature of about 8,128 K. It does not display an infrared excess due to circumstellar dust or a possible infrared-bright companion, but the light from this star is subject to extinction from interstellar dust.

Omicron Scorpii was occasionally mentioned as a possible member of the Upper Scorpius sub-group in the Scorpius–Centaurus OB association during the 20th century. However, it does not appear in more recent membership lists for this group due to its small proper motion and small trigonometric parallax as measured by Hipparcos. This suggests that it is a background star unrelated to Scorpius–Centaurus.

References

A-type bright giants
Upper Scorpius
Scorpius (constellation)
Scorpii, Omicron
Scorpii, 19
147084
080079
6081
Durchmusterung objects